The Corno is a small river of the northern Lazio and eastern Umbria in Italy. Of the towns mentioned, only Serravalle and Triponzo are actually on the river, since in its upper course the Corno's torrential nature is not such as to make it safe for the siting of towns.

Rivers of the Province of Rieti
Rivers of the Province of Perugia
Rivers of Italy